Littletown is a village in the parish of Pittington, County Durham, England. It is situated a few miles to the east of Durham.  The village was previously the site of the Lambton Colliery.

References

Villages in County Durham
Pittington